Lauren Wade (born 22 November 1993) is a Northern Irish footballer who plays as a midfielder for Reading and has appeared for the Northern Ireland women's national team.

Career

Club
On 5 August 2022, Reading announced the double signing of Wade.

International
Wade has been capped for the Northern Ireland national team, appearing for the team during the 2019 FIFA Women's World Cup qualifying cycle.

Career statistics

International goals

References

External links
 
 
 

1993 births
Living people
Women's association footballers from Northern Ireland
Northern Ireland women's international footballers
Women's association football midfielders
Glasgow City F.C. players
UEFA Women's Euro 2022 players